Solapur South Assembly constituency (251) is one of the 288 Vidhan Sabha (legislative assembly) constituencies of Maharashtra state, western India. This constituency is located in Solapur district.

Geographical scope
The constituency comprises Tirhe, Shelga revenue circles in Solapur North taluka, ward nos 7 to 14 and 40 - 43 of Solapur Municipal Corporation and Hotgi, Mandrup and Vinchur revenue circles of Solapur South taluka.

Members of Legislative Assembly

Election Results

Vidhan Sabha elections, 2019

Vidhan Sabha elections, 2014

References

Assembly constituencies of Solapur district
Assembly constituencies of Maharashtra